Teenkahon (Three Obsessions) is a 2014 Psychological mystery-thriller Bengali film directed by Bauddhayan Mukherji and produced by Monalisa Mukherji under the banner of Little Lamb Films.

Cast 
 Suman Mukhopadhyay as Shailen (Senior)
 Kharaj Mukherjee as Radhanath
 Ratan Sarkhel as Tarapada
 Manasi Sinha as Radhanath's wife
 Bhadra Basu as Pishima
 Biswanath Basu as Akshay
 Monu Mukhopadhyay as Gurumoshai
 Ananya Sen as Nayantara
 Barshan Seal as Shailen (Junior)
 Parvathy Baul as Baul
 Joy Sengupta as Sukomol Basu Roy
 Sabyasachi Chakraborty as Gyanesh Mitra
 Phalguni Chatterjee as Mejo Mama
 Rituparna Sengupta as Anamika Guha
 Ashish Vidyarthi as Joydeb Guha
 Dhritiman Chatterjee as Dr Banerjee
 Sumanta Mukherjee as Ronojoy Dutta
 Kaushik Mukherjee as Deepak Addhya
 Sarada Banerjee as Noni
 Panchanan Banerjee as Chowdhury
 Madhuparna Kumar as Ex-speaker's ex-wife
 Pratirup Ghosh as Ayush (Junior)

Themes 
Teenkahon is a triptych film. The Gulf Today described it as "a rare international art house film from Bengal which, as a piece of social document, tries to capture the changing face of morality, the degeneration of values, the increasing pollution of the spoken language and the changing social fabric of Bengal through three stories."

Production

Development 
Teenkahon is the first film of Little Lamb Films, the production house founded by Bauddhayan Mukherji.

Filming 
Filming locations include places in West Bengal such as Kolkata and Bolpur.

Release 

Teenkahon was the only Asian film which was showcased in the prestigious DC Independent Film Festival in 2015. Director Bauddhayan Mukherji was also one of the few selected filmmakers who took part in the summit hosted by US Congressional Entertainment Industries Caucus, the topic of which was the use of drones in films and policy decisions on the usage guidelines. The seminar was presided over by American politician Brad Sherman.

Teenkahon is slated for a theatrical release on 11 September 2015 in India.

Festival screenings 
Teenkahon was screened at the following film festivals in 2015.
 
 Festival du Film d'Asie du Sud Transgressif, Paris, France
 DC Independent Film Festival, Washington, D.C.
 Indian Panorama, International Film Festival of India, Goa, India
 MAMI, Mumbai Film Festival, Mumbai, India
 Indian Film Festival of Stuttgart, Stuttgart, Germany
 Soho International Film Festival, New York, USA
 Bridge Film Fest, Mitrovica, Kosovo
 Bengali Film Festival, Dubai
 ImagineIndia International Film Festival, Madrid, Spain
 Pune International Film Festival, Pune, India
 Indian Film Festival of Melbourne, Melbourne, Australia
 Zimbabwe International Film Festival, Harare, Zimbabwe
 Seattle South Asian Film Festival, Seattle, USA
 Chennai International Film Festival, Chennai, India
 Cannes Underground Film Festival, 
 North Carolina International South Asian Film Festival, North Carolina, USA
 Habitat Film Festival, New Delhi, India
 Madrid International Film Festival, Madrid, Spain
 Hyderabad Bengali Film Festival, Hyderabad, India
 Berlin Underground Film Festival
 Navi Mumbai International Film Festival, Navi Mumbai, India
 National Film Festival, Kozhikode, India

Music 

Playback singer Arnab Chakraborty was chosen to compose the film score for Teenkahon. The film will be his debut as a music composer. Singer Shreya Ghoshal was reported to record a song for the film.

Accolades 
Teenkahon went on to receive multiple awards in various international film festivals, being the only Bengali film in consideration in most cases. It won a Special Mention Award from six student jury members in Paris.

References

External links
 

Bengali-language Indian films
2010s Bengali-language films
Indian mystery thriller films
2014 films